Theimuraz Khurtsilava (born 15 September 1979) is a retired male boxer from Georgia, who competed for his native country at the 2000 Summer Olympics in Sydney, Australia in the men's bantamweight (– 54 kg) division. There he was eliminated in the second round by Russia's eventual silver medalist Raimkul Malakhbekov.

References 
 sports-reference

1979 births
Living people
Male boxers from Georgia (country)
Boxers at the 2000 Summer Olympics
Olympic boxers of Georgia (country)
Bantamweight boxers
21st-century people from Georgia (country)